The arrondissement of Le Puy-en-Velay is an arrondissement of France in the Haute-Loire department in the Auvergne-Rhône-Alpes region. It has 102 communes.

Composition

The communes of the arrondissement of Le Puy-en-Velay, and their INSEE codes, are:

Aiguilhe (43002)
Allègre (43003)
Alleyrac (43004)
Alleyras (43005)
Arlempdes (43008)
Arsac-en-Velay (43010)
Bains (43018)
Barges (43019)
Beaulieu (43021)
Beaune-sur-Arzon (43023)
Bellevue-la-Montagne (43026)
Blanzac (43030)
Blavozy (43032)
Borne (43036)
Le Bouchet-Saint-Nicolas (43037)
Le Brignon (43039)
Brives-Charensac (43041)
Cayres (43042)
Céaux-d'Allègre (43043)
Ceyssac (43045)
Chadrac (43046)
Chadron (43047)
Chamalières-sur-Loire (43049)
Champclause (43053)
La Chapelle-Bertin (43057)
Chaspinhac (43061)
Chaspuzac (43062)
Chaudeyrolles (43066)
Chomelix (43071)
Costaros (43077)
Coubon (43078)
Craponne-sur-Arzon (43080)
Cussac-sur-Loire (43084)
Espaly-Saint-Marcel (43089)
Les Estables (43091)
Fay-sur-Lignon (43092)
Fix-Saint-Geneys (43095)
Freycenet-la-Cuche (43097)
Freycenet-la-Tour (43098)
Goudet (43101)
Jullianges (43108)
Lafarre (43109)
Landos (43111)
Lantriac (43113)
Laussonne (43115)
Lavoûte-sur-Loire (43119)
Lissac (43122)
Loudes (43124)
Malrevers (43126)
Mézères (43134)
Le Monastier-sur-Gazeille (43135)
Monlet (43138)
Le Monteil (43140)
Montusclat (43143)
Moudeyres (43144)
Ouides (43145)
Le Pertuis (43150)
Polignac (43152)
Pradelles (43154)
Présailles (43156)
Le Puy-en-Velay (43157)
Queyrières (43158)
Rauret (43160)
Roche-en-Régnier (43164)
Rosières (43165)
Saint-Arcons-de-Barges (43168)
Saint-Christophe-sur-Dolaison (43174)
Saint-Étienne-du-Vigan (43180)
Saint-Étienne-Lardeyrol (43181)
Saint-Front (43186)
Saint-Geneys-près-Saint-Paulien (43187)
Saint-Georges-Lagricol (43189)
Saint-Germain-Laprade (43190)
Saint-Haon (43192)
Saint-Hostien (43194)
Saint-Jean-d'Aubrigoux (43196)
Saint-Jean-de-Nay (43197)
Saint-Jean-Lachalm (43198)
Saint-Julien-Chapteuil (43200)
Saint-Julien-d'Ance (43201)
Saint-Martin-de-Fugères (43210)
Saint-Paul-de-Tartas (43215)
Saint-Paulien (43216)
Saint-Pierre-du-Champ (43217)
Saint-Pierre-Eynac (43218)
Saint-Privat-d'Allier (43221)
Saint-Victor-sur-Arlanc (43228)
Saint-Vidal (43229)
Saint-Vincent (43230)
Salettes (43231)
Sanssac-l'Église (43233)
Séneujols (43238)
Solignac-sur-Loire (43241)
Vals-près-le-Puy (43251)
Varennes-Saint-Honorat (43252)
Les Vastres (43253)
Vazeilles-Limandre (43254)
Vergezac (43257)
Vernassal (43259)
Le Vernet (43260)
Vielprat (43263)
Vorey (43267)

History

The arrondissement of Le Puy-en-Velay was created in 1800. In 2007 it lost the canton of Saugues to the arrondissement of Brioude.

As a result of the reorganisation of the cantons of France which came into effect in 2015, the borders of the cantons are no longer related to the borders of the arrondissements. The cantons of the arrondissement of Le Puy-en-Velay were, as of January 2015:

 Allègre
 Cayres
 Craponne-sur-Arzon
 Fay-sur-Lignon
 Loudes
 Le Monastier-sur-Gazeille
 Pradelles
 Le Puy-en-Velay-Est
 Le Puy-en-Velay-Nord
 Le Puy-en-Velay-Ouest
 Le Puy-en-Velay-Sud-Est
 Le Puy-en-Velay-Sud-Ouest
 Saint-Julien-Chapteuil
 Saint-Paulien
 Solignac-sur-Loire
 Vorey

References

Le Puy-en-Velay